Shahla Sherkat (born March 30, 1956) is an Iranian journalist, publisher, author, feminist, women's rights activist. She is a prominent Persian feminist author, and one of the pioneers of Women's rights movement in Iran.

Biography 
Sherkat was born in Isfahan, Iran. She holds a bachelor's degree in psychology from Tehran University and a certificate in journalism from Keyhan Institute, also in Tehran. Since 2002, she has been working towards her master's degree in women's studies from Allameh Tabatabai University.

Shahla Sherkat is founder and publisher of Zanan magazine (English:"women"), which focuses on the concerns of Iranian women and continually tested the political waters with its edgy coverage of everything from reform politics to domestic abuse to sex. Zanan had been the most important Iranian women's journal after the Iranian revolution. After Zanan magazine was banned after 16 years of publication, she opened Zanan-e Emruz.

Sherkat has had to appear in court on several occasions when Zanan's content was considered by the Iranian government to be pushing boundaries too far. In 2001 she was sentenced to four months in prison for attending a conference in Berlin at which the future of politics in Iran was discussed following the success of reformist candidates in a parliamentary election.

Honours and awards
 2005 Louis Lyons Award, The Nieman Foundation for Journalism at Harvard University
 2005 The Courage in Journalism Award from the International Women's Media Foundation (IWMF)

See also
 Women's rights movement in Iran

References

Shahla Sherkat, Iran, International Women's Media Foundation

External links
 Farideh Farhi, The Attempted Silencing of Zanan, Informed Comment: Global Affairs, Friday, February 1, 2008, .
 Amal Hamada, Zanan: An Iranian Reformist Women's Magazine, IslamOnline, Tuesday, February 17, 2004, .
 Zanān (Women) Magazine: .

Magazine publishers (people)
Writers from Isfahan
Iranian journalists
Iranian women writers
Iranian women's rights activists
Iranian feminists
Iranian democracy activists
1956 births
Living people
Proponents of Islamic feminism